In Gallo-Roman religion, Luxovios, Latinized as Luxovius, was the god of the waters of Luxeuil, worshiped in Gaul. He was a consort of Bricta. The thermal spring sanctuary at Luxeuil provided evidence of the worship of other deities, including the sky-horseman who bears a solar wheel, and Sirona, another deity associated with healing springs.

Inscriptions
Luxovius is recorded in the following two inscriptions, both from Luxeuil-les-Bains :

[Lus]soio / et Brictae / Divixti/us Cons/tans / v(otum) s(olvit) <l=T>(ibens) m(erito)
"To Lusso(v)ios and Bricta, Divixtius Constans freely and deservedly fulfilled his vow." (CIL 13, 05425)

 Luxovio / et Brixtae / G(aius) Iul(ius) Fir/manus / v(otum) s(olvit) l(ibens) m(erito)
"To Luxovios and Brixta, Gaius Julius Firmans freely and deservedly fulfilled his vow." 
(AE 1951, 00231; CIL 13, 05426)

Etymology
The name Luxovios implies light symbolism. This may indicate that the god was a deity of both light and curative spring waters, two elements that were strongly linked in the Celtic world.

References

Bibliography
 Année Epigraphique volume 1951
 Corpus Inscriptionum Latinarum (CIL), volume 13, Tres Galliae
 Dictionary of Celtic Myth and Legend. Miranda Green. Thames and Hudson Ltd. London. 1997

Gaulish gods
Water gods